The Karaj River is a river on the central plateau of Iran. It is the second largest river after Zayandarud in the central plateau region.

About
The Karaj River runs roughly 152 miles (245 km) in length. Its headwaters are in the Central Alborz mountain range, north of Tehran in Alborz Province. It flows south past the city of Karaj, and then flows eastward with its tributary Jajrood River joining in Tehran Province, to flow into the endorheic Namak Lake basin in the Qom Province.

The Amir Kabir Dam is constructed across the river in the foothills of the Alborz mountain range.

Gallery

References

Rivers of Alborz Province
Alborz (mountain range)
Landforms of Alborz Province
Landforms of Qom Province
Landforms of Tehran Province